Arijan Qollaku (born 4 January 1997) is a professional footballer who plays as a right back for Swiss club Aarau. Born in Switzerland, Qollaku represents Albania internationally.

Club career
Qollaku was born in Bülach, a town in the Canton of Zürich, Switzerland and joined FC Zürich as a youth. He was released in July 2015 and spent time on trial with fellow Swiss side FC Wil, even featuring in a friendly against his former employers. However, ultimately he joined Grasshoppers in early 2016 and signed his first professional contract in February 2017 alongside teammates Nedim Bajrami and Petar Pusic. He made his debut the next month, playing 64 minutes in a 1–0 loss against Basel.

International career
Qollaku was eligible to represent Kosovo and Albania in international level. He refused an invitation from Kosovo national under-21 football team to accept invitation from Albania national under-21 football team coach Alban Bushi.

Qollaku was called up to Albania U21 for the Friendly match against France U21 on 5 June 2017 and the 2019 UEFA European Under-21 Championship qualification opening match against Estonia U21 on 12 June 2017.

He received Albanian citizenship from president Bujar Nishani on 12 June 2017, the day of the opening match of the qualifiers against Estonia U21 thus couldn't participate in this match, but however he became eligible to play in the next competitive matches.

Career statistics

Club

Notes

References

1997 births
Living people
People from Bülach
Albanian footballers
Albania youth international footballers
Swiss men's footballers
Kosovo Albanians
Swiss people of Albanian descent
Swiss people of Kosovan descent
Association football fullbacks
Grasshopper Club Zürich players
FC Schaffhausen players
FC Aarau players
Swiss 1. Liga (football) players
Swiss Super League players
Swiss Challenge League players
Sportspeople from the canton of Zürich